Brian Said (born 15 May 1973 in Valletta, Malta) is a professional footballer currently managing Maltese First Division side St. Andrews, and captain of the Luxol St Andrew's Veteran Team, where he plays as a defender.

Brian is tall and strong in the air and can generally compensate for his lack of speed with his ability to read the game. Said is also well known for his contribution to goal scoring, and is often a threat from set pieces.

Playing career

St. Andrews
Brian Said started his career with St. Andrews, playing regularly in the first team from the 1991–1992 season. Early in his career he was used both as a midfielder and even as a striker.

In total Brian Said recorded 51 appearances with St. Andrews, and scored ten goals.

Birkirkara
Said spent the 1994–1995 season on loan with Birkirkara, where he made 17 appearances and scored on one occasion.

Floriana
Next for Said was a move to Floriana in 1995. Now firmly settled in a central defender, his performances eventually earned him a call-up to the Malta national team.

Brian spent six successful seasons with Floriana from 1995 to 2001, where he recorded 119 appearances and scored six goals for the club.

Sliema Wanderers
In 2001, Said moved to the ambitious Sliema Wanderers. Brian now an integral member of the Maltese national team produced some great performances during his time with Sliema Wanderers, and even became the team's captain, taking over from Sliema Wanderers legend Noel Turner.

During seven successful seasons spanning from 2001 to 2008, Brian made 181 appearances for The Wanderers, and scored 14 goals.

Marsaxlokk
In July 2008 it was confirmed that Marsaxlokk had signed Brian Said from Sliema Wanderers. It is possible that Said will form a partnership with another former Sliema Wanderers defender, in the shape of Carlo Mamo.

Brian made his league debut for Marsaxlokk on 24 August 2008, where the side played newly promoted Qormi. Said played the full match, in which both sides shared a 1–1 draw.

During one full season with Marsaxlokk, Brian made 24 appearances and scored two goals.

Floriana
Following Marsaxlokk's relegation to the Maltese First Division, a clause in Said's contract was activated, allowing him to leave the club for free.

On 28 September 2009 it was confirmed that Brian Said had joined Floriana for the second time in his career.

International goals
Scores and results list Malta's goal tally first.

References

External links
 Brian Said at MaltaFootball.com
 
 

1973 births
Living people
Maltese footballers
Malta international footballers
Birkirkara F.C. players
Floriana F.C. players
Sliema Wanderers F.C. players
Marsaxlokk F.C. players
People from Valletta
St. Andrews F.C. players
Association football defenders